Fabian Malleier (born 4 January 1998) is an Italian luger. He competed in the men's doubles event at the 2018 Winter Olympics. Malleier is an athlete of the Gruppo Sportivo Esercito.

References

External links
 
 

1998 births
Living people
Italian male lugers
Olympic lugers of Italy
Lugers at the 2018 Winter Olympics
Lugers at the 2016 Winter Youth Olympics
Place of birth missing (living people)
Sportspeople from Merano
Lugers of Gruppo Sportivo Esercito